The 2009 FIVB Volleyball Men's Club World Championship was the 5th edition of the event. It was held in Doha, Qatar from 3 to 8 November 2009.

Golden formula
For the first time in an FIVB tournament, a new rule trialled during the FIVB Volleyball Men's Club World Championship Doha 2009 in order to “keep the ball flying” and add value to a rally for the spectator. The Golden Formula playing system requires that the first attack for each team begins from the back row in an attempt to produce longer rallies.

Qualification

Pools composition

Squads

Venue

Preliminary round
All times are Arabia Standard Time (UTC+03:00).

Pool A

|}

|}

Pool B

|}

|}

Final round
All times are Arabia Standard Time (UTC+03:00).

Semifinals

|}

3rd place match

|}

Final

|}

Final standing

Awards

Most Valuable Player
 Matey Kaziyski (Trentino BetClic)
Best Scorer
 Bartosz Kurek (PGE Skra Bełchatów)
Best Spiker
 Matey Kaziyski (Trentino BetClic)
Best Blocker
 Marcin Możdżonek (PGE Skra Bełchatów)

Best Server
 Osmany Juantorena (Trentino BetClic)
Best Setter
 Raphael Oliveira (Trentino BetClic)
Best Libero
 Aleksey Verbov (Zenit Kazan)

External links
Official website
Final Standing
Awards
Prize Money

2009 FIVB Men's Club World Championship
FIVB Men's Club World Championship
FIVB Men's Club World Championship
FIVB Volleyball Men's Club World Championship
Sports competitions in Doha